"Don't Cry" is a song by Seal. It was released as the final single from his second studio album Seal (a.k.a. Seal II), as a double A-side with "Prayer for the Dying".

Charts

Weekly charts

Year-end charts

References

1995 singles
Seal (musician) songs
Songs written by Seal (musician)
Song recordings produced by Trevor Horn
1995 songs
Music videos directed by Wayne Isham
ZTT Records singles
Sire Records singles